The Fugs are an American rock band formed in New York City in late 1964, by the poets Ed Sanders and Tuli Kupferberg, with Ken Weaver on drums. Soon afterward, they were joined by Peter Stampfel and Steve Weber of The Holy Modal Rounders. Kupferberg named the band from a euphemism for fuck used in Norman Mailer's novel The Naked and the Dead.

The band was one of the leaders of the underground scene of the 1960s and became an important part of the American counterculture of that decade. The group is known for its comedic, even lewd, nature but also earned fame through their persistent anti-Vietnam War sentiment during the 1960s. Some 1969 correspondence, found inside an FBI file on the rock group The Doors, called The Fugs the "most vulgar thing the human mind could possibly conceive". They have been derided for their scatological lyrics. The Fugs have been labeled avant-rock noise music.

Formation 
The band's original core members, Ed Sanders, Tuli Kupferberg, and Ken Weaver, were joined at various times in the 1960s by a number of others, some of whom were noted session musicians or members of other bands. These included Weber and Stampfel, bassist John Anderson, guitarist Vinny Leary, guitarist Peter Kearney, keyboardist Lee Crabtree, guitarist Jon Kalb, guitarist Stefan Grossman, singer and guitarist Jake Jacobs, guitarist Eric Gale, bassist Chuck Rainey, keyboardist Robert Banks, bassist Charles Larkey, guitarist Ken Pine, guitarist Danny Kortchmar, clarinetist Perry Robinson, bassist Bill Wolf, and drummer Bob Mason.

For most of their career, the Fugs were composed of the primary singer-songwriters Sanders and, until his death, Kupferberg; the composer, songwriter, guitarist and long-time Allen Ginsberg collaborator Steven Taylor; singer-songwriter and percussionist Coby Batty; and Scott Petito, a musician and music producer.

The band signed a record contract with ESP-Disk in 1965. The Fugs said that "our royalty rate was less than 3%, one of the lower percentages in the history of western civilization". The owner of the label, Bernard Stollman, has frequently faced accusation of not paying royalties to artists. In February 1967, the group was signed to Atlantic Records and recorded one album, The Fugs Eat It, but it was never released.

Career 
A satirical rock band with a political slant, the Fugs have performed at various war protests – against the Vietnam War and since the 1980s at events around other U.S. involved wars. The band's often frank and humorous lyrics about sex, drugs, and politics occasionally generated hostile reactions, most notably from the Federal Bureau of Investigation in the late 1960s. The group is referenced several times in the F.B.I. file on the Doors; an excerpt mentions eleven songs from The Fugs First Album that are "vulgar and repulsive and are most suggestive".

In 1968, they toured Europe twice: in May to Denmark and Sweden where they wrote the song "The Swedish Nada" and played with Fleetwood Mac, Ten Years After, and The Nice; and in September to Germany where they played with Peter Brötzmann, Cuby and the Blizzards, Family, Guru Guru Groove, Alexis Korner, David Peel, Tangerine Dream, at the Internationale Essener Songtage in the Grugahalle in Essen.

In a 2012 interview with National Public Radio, Ed Sanders read a leaflet from an August 1965 show: "The Fugs present: Night of napalm, songs against the war, rock n' roll bomb shrieks, heavy metal orgasms! Watch all The Fugs die in a napalm raid!"

Their participation in the National Mobilization Committee to End the War in Vietnam's 1967 March on the Pentagon, at which they and others purportedly attempted to encircle and levitate the Pentagon, is chronicled in Norman Mailer's book The Armies of the Night. A recording of this event is featured on the Fugs' 1968 album, Tenderness Junction, entitled "Exorcising the Evil Spirits from the Pentagon Oct. 21, 1967". Beforehand, Sanders and Kupferberg had prepared an elaborate exorcism ritual, and rented a flatbed truck along with a sound system. As is heard on the album, the two gathered a large crowd in front of the Pentagon and repeatedly chanted, "Out, demons, out!"

One of their better-known songs is an adaptation of Matthew Arnold's poem "Dover Beach". Others were settings of William Blake's poems "Ah! Sun-flower" and "How Sweet I Roam'd". Another, "Nothing", is a paraphrasing of the Yiddish folk song "Bulbes".

After pursuing individual projects over the years, in 1984 Sanders and Kupferberg decided to re-form the band and stage a series of Fugs reunion concerts. On August 15, 1988, at the Byrdcliff Barn in Woodstock, New York, the Fugs performed one of their first real reunion concerts. This incarnation of the Fugs included, at various times, the guitarist and singer Steve Taylor (who was also Allen Ginsberg's teaching assistant at the Naropa Institute), the drummer and singer Coby Batty, the bassist Mark Kramer, the guitarist Vinny Leary (who had contributed to the first two original Fugs albums), and the bassist and keyboardist Scott Petito. The re-formed Fugs performed concerts at numerous locations in the United States and Europe over the next several years.

In 1994 the band intended to perform a series of concerts in Woodstock, New York, (where Sanders had lived for many years) to commemorate the 1969 Woodstock Festival, which had actually occurred near the town of Bethel, some 50 miles away. They learned that a group of promoters were planning to stage Woodstock '94 that August near Saugerties, about 8 miles from Woodstock, and that this festival would be much more tightly controlled and commercialized than the original. Consequently, The Fugs decided to stage their own August 1994 concerts as "The Real Woodstock Festival", in an atmosphere more in keeping with the spirit of the 1969 festival. The basic Fugs roster of Sanders, Kupferberg, Taylor, Batty, and Petito performed in this series of concerts with additional vocal support from Amy Fradon and Leslie Ritter and also with appearances by Allen Ginsberg and Country Joe McDonald. In 2003, the group released The Fugs Final CD (Part 1) with positive feedback. In 2004, The Fugs began to record Be Free: The Fugs Final CD (Part 2).

In 2008 their song "CIA Man" was featured during the end credits for the movie Burn After Reading, directed by the Coen brothers. In 2009, Kupferberg suffered two strokes, the latter of which severely hindered his eyesight. He was under constant care, but was able to finish recording his tracks for Be Free in his New York City apartment. A benefit for Kupferberg was held in Brooklyn, New York, in February 2010, featuring all of the Fugs minus Kupferberg, as well as Lou Reed, Sonic Youth, Patti Smith Group guitarist Lenny Kaye, and others. Be Free: The Fugs Final CD (Part 2) was released on February 23, 2010. The album art, designed by Sanders, featured a snail reading Allen Ginsberg's poem "Howl". The album was produced by Taylor and Sanders.

Kupferberg died on July 12, 2010, in Manhattan, at the age of 86. In 2008, in one of his last interviews, he told Mojo magazine, "Nobody who lived through the '50s thought the '60s could've existed. So there's always hope."

The remaining Fugs from time to time seriously consider further performances. On June 11, 2011, the four remaining Fugs performed at Queen Elizabeth Hall in London as part of the annual Meltdown Festival, curated that year by Ray Davies of the Kinks. Their set received a four-star review in The Guardian.

They performed at the Beachland Ballroom in Cleveland on November 30, 2012, and at the City Winery in Chicago on December 1, 2012 .

Film appearances 
The band can be seen performing in the cult film Chappaqua (1967) by Conrad Rooks. Tuli Kupferberg made appearances in W.R.: Mysteries of the Organism (1971) by Dušan Makavejev and played God in Voulez-vous coucher avec God? (1972) by Michael Hirsh and Jack Christie.

Their song, "CIA Man", can be heard during the closing credits of the 2008 Coen Brothers' film Burn After Reading, and during the closing credits of the fifth episode of the 2017 docudrama miniseries Wormwood.

Primary lineups 
The Fugs went through a number of lineup changes. Below are those that lasted the longest. For instance, guitarist Stefan Grossman was with the band for only several weeks, so this lineup is not included.

1964 – February 1965
 Kendell Kardt – vocals
 Tuli Kupferberg – vocals
 Ed Sanders – vocals
 Ken Weaver – vocals, conga
 Steve Weber – guitar, vocals
 Peter Stampfel – fiddle, harmonica, vocals

Summer 1965
 Tuli Kupferberg – vocals, percussion
 Ed Sanders – vocals
 Ken Weaver – drums, vocals
 Steve Weber – guitar, vocals
 Vinny Leary – guitar, vocals
 John Anderson – bass, vocals

September – December 1965
 Tuli Kupferberg – vocals, percussion
 Ed Sanders – vocals
 Ken Weaver – drums, vocals
 Steve Weber – guitar, vocals

December 1965 – July 1966
 Tuli Kupferberg – vocals
 Ed Sanders – vocals
 Ken Weaver – drums, vocals
 Lee Crabtree – keyboards, percussion
 Vinny Leary – guitar, vocals
 John Anderson – bass, vocals
 Pete Kearney – guitar, vocals

July – October 1966
 Tuli Kupferberg – vocals
 Ed Sanders – vocals
 Ken Weaver – drums, vocals
 Lee Crabtree – keyboards, percussion
 Jon Kalb – lead guitar
 Vinny Leary – rhythm guitar, vocals
 John Anderson – bass, vocals

October 1966 – Spring 1967
 Tuli Kupferberg – vocals
 Ed Sanders – vocals
 Ken Weaver – drums, vocals
 Lee Crabtree – keyboards, percussion
 Jake Jacobs – guitar, vocals
 Chuck Rainey – bass

Summer 1967 – Summer 1968
 Tuli Kupferberg – vocals
 Ed Sanders – vocals
 Ken Weaver – drums, vocals
 Ken Pine – guitar, vocals
 Danny Kortchmar – guitar, violin
 Charles Larkey – bass

Winter 1968 – March 1969
 Tuli Kupferberg – vocals
 Ed Sanders – vocals
 Ken Weaver – drums, vocals
 Ken Pine – guitar, vocals
 Bill Wolf – bass, vocals
 Bob Mason – drums

1984 – 2010
 Tuli Kupferberg – vocals
 Ed Sanders – vocals
 Steven Taylor – vocals, guitar
 Coby Batty – drums, percussion, vocals
 Scott Petito – bass, keyboards

2010 – present
 Ed Sanders – vocals
 Steven Taylor – vocals, guitar
 Coby Batty – drums, percussion, vocals
 Scott Petito – bass, keyboards

Discography

Studio albums 

 The Fugs First Album is a retitled reissue of the Broadside/Folkways LP.

Live albums

Compilation albums

References

External links 

The Fugs Archive at Fales Library

 
Musical groups established in 1964
Rock music groups from New York (state)
ESP-Disk artists
Fontana Records artists
Reprise Records artists
Transatlantic Records artists
Protopunk groups
1964 establishments in New York City
American satirists
Political music groups
Freak scene musicians